Mac Lesggy (born Olivier Lesgourges, 1 August 1962) is a French television presenter and producer.

Biography 
Mac Lesggy was born Olivier Lesgourges in Bayonne, Pyrénées-Atlantiques. He spent his childhood in Biarritz and obtained his baccalaureate there in 1979. He later graduated from the Institut national agronomique Paris-Grignon in 1984. He began his professional career studying statistics and marketing.

Career 
In 1990, he did a professional training in television jobs. He established at the same time a project for a scientific television program accepted by the channel M6. To produce it, he founded the society VM Productions that later became VM Group. Since February 1991, he has hosted the scientific television program E=M6.

Since the early 2000s he has hosted a number of television programs such as Le grand test, Le grand quizz and QI, a television IQ test. He passed a casting test to host the program Êtes-vous plus fort qu'un élève de 10 ans ? with Laurent Boyer and Stéphane Rotenberg.

He has appeared in some advertisements such as M6 Mobile and Oral-B. He has also appeared in the video game E=M6 Défi Cérébral, a training game inspired by his scientific television program.

He is also member of the jury of the program Ma maison est la plus originale, broadcast in autumn 2011 and since February 2013.

In May 2012, he participated at the eighth step of Pékin Express, le passager mystère as the mystery passenger.

Personal life 
Mac Lesggy is married and has three children, two daughters and one son. He is well known for his eccentric glasses designed by Alain Mikli.

Honours 
In 1995, Mac Lesggy received the "Grand Prix de l'Information Scientifique" from the French Academy of Sciences.

E=M6 received a prize at the Festival Images et Sciences de Palaiseau in 1992, as well as the 7 d'Or for "Best educative program" in 2001.

References

External links 
 Profile of Mac Lesggy on the official site of M6 
 E=M6 on the official site of M6 

1962 births
French television presenters
French television producers
People from Bayonne
Living people